Jakob Brøchner Madsen (born in Randers, Denmark) is an economist, professor and former financial analyst and deputy chief economist (Bank of Jutland).  He was one of few economists who predicted the IT bubble in 2001 and the housing bubble in 2006 and the global financial crisis. In 2006 he and Jens Kjaer Sørensen wrote: "The bursting of this housing bubble will have a severe impact on the world economy and may even result in a recession."

Biography
He was ranked as number 949 in the world of the 55000+ economists who published at least one JEL classified article over the period from 1994 to 1998, according to a study funded by the European Economic Association.

References

External links
 Jakob Brochner Madsen personal website
 When the Dooms day economist was right

Danish economists
living people
people from Randers
year of birth missing (living people)